Flaming Hearts is a 1978 West German drama film directed by Walter Bockmayer and Rolf Bührmann. It was entered into the 28th Berlin International Film Festival. Michael Rother produced the music for the film which was released the previous year as his debut solo album Flammende Herzen.

Plot
Peter Huber (Peter Kern), the proprietor of a Bavarian corner newsstand, wins a free trip to New York City in a magazine contest, he is overjoyed. Filled with romantic ideas from the movies, his actual encounter with the gritty realities of the Big Apple are sobering. Nonetheless, he is in for the adventure of his life. First, he meets Karola Faber (Barbara Valentin), the German wife of a U.S. G.I. who has found life in the States not all it's cracked up to be: she has left her husband and makes her living through prostitution. Peter and Karola visit the local German émigré community's Oktoberfest, and win the festival's King and Queen crown. Their prize is a cow, which accompanies them on their further journeys in New York City.

Cast
 Peter Kern – Peter Huber
 Barbara Valentin – Karola Faber
 Enzi Fuchs – Anna Schlätel
 Katja Rupé – Magda Weberscheid
 Anneliese Geisler – Frau Geisler
 Peter Geisler – Herr Geisler
 Rolf Bührmann – Conferencier
 Armin Meier – Fahrer
 Ila von Hasperg – Verkäuferin
 Evelyn Künneke – Sängerin im Lokal

References

External links

1978 films
1978 comedy-drama films
West German films
1970s German-language films
German drama films
Films directed by Walter Bockmayer
Films set in New York City
1970s German films